The abbreviation Myr, "million years", is a unit of a quantity of  (i.e. ) years, or 31.556926 teraseconds.

Usage
Myr (million years) is in common use in fields such as Earth science and cosmology. Myr is also used with Mya (million years ago). Together they make a reference system, one to a quantity, the other to a particular place in a year numbering system that is time before the present.

Myr is deprecated in geology, but in astronomy Myr is standard. Where "myr" is seen in geology it is usually "Myr" (a unit of mega-years). In astronomy it is usually "Myr" (Million years).

Debate 
In geology a debate remains open concerning the use of Myr (duration) plus Ma (million years ago) versus using only the term Ma. In either case the term Ma is used in geology literature conforming to ISO 31-1 (now ISO 80000-3) and NIST 811 recommended practices. Traditional style geology literature is written 
The "ago" is implied, so that any such year number "X Ma" between 66 and 145 is "Cretaceous", for good reason. But the counter argument is that having myr for a duration and Mya for an age mixes unit systems, and tempts capitalization errors: "million" need not be capitalized, but "mega" must be; "ma" would technically imply a milliyear (a thousandth of a year, or 8 hours). On this side of the debate, one avoids myr and simply adds ago explicitly (or adds BP), as in 
In this case, "79 Ma" means only a quantity of 79 million years, without the meaning of "79 million years ago".

See also 
 Byr
 Kyr
 Megaannum (Ma)
 Symbols y and yr

References

Units of time
Units of measurement in astronomy
Geology